In Canada, classical music includes a range of musical styles rooted in the traditions of Western or European classical music that European settlers brought to the country from the 17th century and onwards. As well, it includes musical styles brought by other ethnic communities from the 19th century and onwards, such as Indian classical music (Hindustani and Carnatic music) and Chinese classical music. Since Canada's emergence as a nation in 1867, the country has produced its own composers, musicians and ensembles. As well, it has developed a music infrastructure that includes training institutions, conservatories, performance halls, and a public radio broadcaster, CBC, which programs a moderate amount of Classical music. There is a high level of public interest in classical music and education.

Canada has produced a number of respected ensembles, including the Montreal Symphony Orchestra and the Toronto Symphony Orchestra, as well as a number of well-known Baroque orchestras and chamber ensembles, such as the
I Musici de Montréal Chamber Orchestra and the Tafelmusik Baroque Orchestra and Chamber Choir. Major Canadian opera companies such as the Canadian Opera Company have nurtured the talents of Canadian opera singers such as Maureen Forrester, Ben Heppner, and Jon Vickers. Well-known Canadian musicians include pianist Glenn Gould; violinist James Ehnes; pianist Jan Lisiecki; conductor Yannick Nézet-Séguin; flautist Timothy Hutchins; and composers Claude Vivier, R. Murray Schafer and Harry Somers. Well-known music schools include the Royal Conservatory of Music (Canada) in Toronto and the Schulich School of Music at McGill University in Montreal.

Opera and vocal

Opera singers 

A number of Canadian singers who learned their craft in Canadian opera companies went on to sing in major international opera houses.

The Holman Opera Troupe, which toured throughout Canada in the 1860s–1880s, were at separate periods, lessees of the London Opera House, the Royal Lyceum, Toronto, the Grand Opera House, Ottawa, and the Theatre Royal, Montreal. The troupe consisted of Mr. George Holman, his wife, his daughter Sallie Holman (soprano/principal singer) another daughter, and two sons, with some others, including William H. Crane and Sallie's husband Mr. J. T. Dalton. Bertha May Crawford (1886–1934), a coloratura soprano from Toronto, was probably the only Canadian singer of her era to achieve significant success performing in major opera houses in Russia and Poland during the First World War and through the 1920s.

In the early 20th century, contralto singer Portia White (1911–1968) achieved international fame because of her voice and stage presence. As a Canadian of African descent, her popularity helped to open previously closed doors for talented blacks who followed. She has been declared "a person of national historic significance" by the Government of Canada. George London (1920–1985) was a Montreal-born concert and operatic bass-baritone. From 1975 until 1980 he was general director of the Washington Opera. Pierrette Alarie 1921, is a French-Canadian coloratura soprano. Lois Marshall (1924–1997) was a Canadian soprano who was made a Companion of the Order of Canada in 1967. She was both a concert and recital singer, first as a soprano and later as a mezzo-soprano.

Louis Quilico (1925–2000) was a Canadian baritone, known as "Mr Rigoletto." In Canada, Quilico performed regularly with the Canadian Opera Company in Toronto, and throughout the 1970s he performed in opera companies in the United States. Quilico's contemporary Jon Vickers (born 1926) is a tenor born in Prince Albert, Saskatchewan, who joined the Metropolitan Opera in 1960. A powerful "heldentenor", he became known for his German- and Italian-language roles. Maureen Forrester (1930–2010) was a Canadian operatic contralto known for her performances of Mahler and for her great stamina onstage. Victor Braun (1935–2001) was a Canadian-born operatic baritone who performed at major opera houses from Europe and North America. His contemporary Teresa Stratas (born 1938) is a soprano who had a 36-year career at the Metropolitan Opera. Judith Forst (born 1943) is a Canadian mezzo-soprano who was made an Officer of the Order of Canada in 1991.

Richard Margison (born 1953) is an operatic tenor who was named an Officer of the Order of Canada in 2001 and lives in Toronto, Ontario, Canada. Gino Quilico (born 1955) is a lyric baritone of Italian descent and the son of Canadian baritone Louis Quilico and Lina Pizzolongo. Ben Heppner (born 1956) is a tenor, specializing in opera and classical symphonic works for voice. performs frequently with major opera companies in the United States and Europe, as well as concert appearances with major symphony orchestras. Gerald Finley (born 1960) is a bass-baritone opera singer.  renowned for his interpretations of Mozart roles Michael Schade (born 1965) is a Canadian operatic tenor, who was born in Geneva and raised in Germany and Canada; he is known as a "Mozart tenor". Russell Braun (born 1965) is an operatic lyric baritone, who is the son of baritone Victor Braun. Isabel Bayrakdarian (born 1974) is an Armenian-Canadian opera singer who moved to Canada as a teenager. James Westman (born 1972) is an operatic baritone, in his youth he was the first boy soprano to perform Gustav Mahler, 4th symphony with Leonard Bernstein.  Joni Henson (born 1977 in Sault Ste. Marie, Ontario) and Measha Brueggergosman (born 1977 in Fredericton, New Brunswick) are both Sopranos that perform regularly both in concert and in fully staged Operas.

Opera companies 

Canadian Opera Company
Opéra de Montréal
Vancouver Opera
Manitoba Opera
Opera Atelier
Opera in Concert 
Opera Lyra Ottawa
Calgary Opera
Edmonton Opera
Opera Hamilton 
Opéra de Québec
Pacific Opera Victoria

Choirs 
Toronto Mendelssohn Choir
Amadeus Choir
Nathaniel Dett Chorale
Tafelmusik Chamber Choir
Ottawa Bach Choir
Theatre of Early Music

Ensembles and performers

Orchestras and ensembles 

Symphony orchestras:
Victoria Symphony
Vancouver Symphony Orchestra
Calgary Philharmonic
Edmonton Symphony Orchestra
Saskatoon Symphony
Regina Symphony Orchestra
Winnipeg Symphony Orchestra
Thunder Bay Symphony Orchestra
Kitchener-Waterloo Symphony
Hamilton Philharmonic Orchestra
Toronto Symphony Orchestra
National Arts Centre Orchestra
Orchestre Métropolitain du Grand Montréal
Orchestre Symphonique de Montréal (Montreal Symphony Orchestra)
Orchestre Symphonique de Québec (Quebec Symphony Orchestra)
Symphony New Brunswick
Symphony Nova Scotia

Community orchestras:
Oakville Symphony Orchestra
Ottawa Symphony Orchestra
Prince Edward Island Symphony Orchestra

Baroque orchestras and chamber ensembles:
Amati Quartet
New Orford String Quartet
Quatuor Bozzini
Canadian Brass
Canadian Chamber Ensemble
I Musici de Montréal Chamber Orchestra
Les Violons du Roy
Tafelmusik Baroque Orchestra
Quartetto Gelato
Manitoba Chamber Orchestra

Instrumentalists

Pianists 
Alberto Guerrero (1886–1959) was a Chilean-Canadian composer, pianist, and teacher whose students included Glenn Gould and Jon Kimura Parker. Glenn Gould (1932–1982) was noted for his recordings of the music of Johann Sebastian Bach, his technical proficiency, unorthodox musical philosophy, and eccentric personality and piano technique. Zeyda Ruga Suzuki (born 1943, Havana, Cuba) is a Cuban-Canadian classical pianist and Juno Award nominee. Dang Thai Son (born 1958, Hanoi, Vietnam) is a classical pianist known for being the first Asian pianist to win the International Frederick Chopin Piano Competition in 1980. He remains a well-known Chopin interpreter, and now resides in Montreal, Quebec, Canada. Naida Cole (born 1974) has recorded music by Fauré, Chabrier, Satie and Ravel. Wonny Song Korean-Canadian pianist and professor. First Prize winner at the 2005 Young Concert Artists International Auditions in New York, Prix d'Europe 2003, and winner of the Minnesota Orchestra's WAMSO Competition.

Steve Barakatt
Marc-André Hamelin
Angela Hewitt
Anton Kuerti
Lee Kum-Sing
Louis Lortie
Jan Lisiecki
Harold Bradley (pianist)
Kenneth G. Mills
Jon Kimura Parker
Christina Petrowska Quilico
Giancarlo Scalia
Wonny Song
Zeyda Ruga Suzuki

Violinists 

Canadian violinists:
Martin Beaver
Alexandre Da Costa
Angèle Dubeau
James Ehnes
Leila Josefowicz
Chantal Juillet
Moshe Hammer
Susanne Hou
Catherine Manoukian
Peter Oundjian
Walter Prystawski
Erika Raum
Lara St. John
Scott St. John
Steven Staryk
Harold Sumberg
Ralitsa Tcholakova

Non-Canadian violinists within the Canadian music community:
Jacques Israelievitch
Hidetaro Suzuki
Pinchas Zukerman

Other instrumentalists 
Other string players include violist Rivka Golani and cellists Donald Whitton (a founding member of NACO), Ottawa-based chamber musician Julian Armour (also a chamber music festival organizer), and soloist Ofra Harnoy. Well-known wind players include bassoonists such as William Douglas and Nadina Mackie Jackson; flautists Timothy Hutchins and Alexander Zonjic; and oboists such as James Mason and Marc Rogers. Notable Canadian organists include Eric Robertson, Gerald Bales, François Brassard, and Healey Willan. There are also several well-known Canadian organ builders, including Casavant Frères and Gabriel Kney. Two classical guitarists from Canada have become well known: Liona Boyd and Norbert Kraft. Well-known brass players from Canada include Jens Lindemann (trumpet), James Sommerville (horn) and Alain Trudel (trombone).

Composers 

Robert Aitken
István Anhalt
Louis Applebaum
Violet Archer
Michael Conway Baker
Steve Barakatt
John Beckwith
Denys Bouliane
John Burge
Amice Calverley
Pat Carrabré
Brian Cherney
Eleanor Joanne Daley
Victor Davies
R. Nathaniel Dett
Airat Ichmouratov
John Estacio
Gordon Fitzell
Malcolm Forsyth
André Gagnon
Steven Gellman
Peter Hannan
Stephen Hatfield
Christos Hatzis
Gary Kulesha
Rachel Laurin
Alexina Louie
Hummie Mann
Bruce Mather
Oskar Morawetz
Marjan Mozetich
Owen Pallett
Randolph Peters

Imant Raminsh
John Rea
Godfrey Ridout
John Robertson
James Rolfe
George Ross
Vahram Sargsyan
Giancarlo Scalia
R. Murray Schafer

Howard Shore
Mark Sirett
Harry Somers
Donald Steven
Claude Vivier
John Weinzweig
Healey Willan
See also:
Association of Canadian Women Composers
Canadian League of Composers
Canadian Music Centre – An archive of Canadian compositions.
SOCAN – Society of Composers, Authors, and Music Publishers of Canada
Wikipedia's List of Canadian Composers

Conductors

Canadian conductors 

Raffi Armenian (Canadian Chamber Ensemble)
Mario Bernardi (Canadian Opera Company, National Arts Centre Orchestra, Calgary Philharmonic, CBC Radio Orchestra)
Boris Brott (National Academy Orchestra, McGill Chamber Orchestra, Hamilton Philharmonic Orchestra)
Bernard Labadie (Les Violons du Roy and La Chapelle de Québec)
Martin MacDonald (National Academy Orchestra)
Sir Ernest MacMillan (Toronto Symphony)
Yannick Nézet-Séguin (Orchestre Métropolitain du Grand Montréal)
Peter Oundjian (Toronto Symphony)
Ivars Taurins (Tafelmusik Chamber Choir)
Wilfrid Pelletier (Quebec Symphony Orchestra)
Rosemary Thomson (Calgary Philharmonic, Canadian Opera Company)
Tyrone Paterson (Manitoba Opera, Opera Lyra Ottawa)
 Dr Lisette Canton (the Ottawa Bach Choir)
Timothy Vernon (Pacific Opera Victoria)

Conductors of other nationalities 

Kazuyoshi Akiyama (Vancouver Symphony Orchestra)
Karel Ančerl (Toronto Symphony)
Sergiu Comissiona (Vancouver Symphony Orchestra)
Sir Andrew Davis (Toronto Symphony)
Pierre Dervaux (Orchestre Symphonique de Québec)
Charles Dutoit (Montreal Symphony Orchestra)
William Eddins (Edmonton Symphony Orchestra)
John Eliot Gardiner (CBC Radio Orchestra)
Gunther Herbig (Toronto Symphony)
Otto Klemperer (Montreal Symphony Orchestra)
Luigi von Kunits (New Symphony Orchestra, precursor of the Toronto Symphony)
Zubin Mehta (Montreal Symphony Orchestra)
Alexander Mickelthwate (Winnipeg Symphony Orchestra)
Kent Nagano (Orchestre Symphonique de Montréal)
Seiji Ozawa (Toronto Symphony)
Trevor Pinnock (National Arts Centre Orchestra)
Jukka-Pekka Saraste (Toronto Symphony)
Walter Susskind (Toronto Symphony)
Bramwell Tovey (Vancouver Symphony Orchestra))
Pinchas Zukerman (National Arts Centre Orchestra)
Christian Kluxen (Victoria Symphony)
Kees Bakels (Victoria Symphony)

Recording, broadcasting, and publishing

Record labels 
Acoma Company
Analekta
Atma Classique
CBC Records
Centrediscs
empreintes DIGITALes
Leaf Music
Marquis Classics
Opening Day Entertainment Group

Radio stations 
Radio broadcasting of classical music in Canada is extremely limited.  Historically, the primary source of classical music on Canadian radio was the national CBC Radio 2 network, however that network has greatly reduced its classical music programming in favor of Canadian popular music programming, with mainly "accessible" classical music available only five hours a day in the middle of the day.

There are three commercial radio stations in Canada offering a classical music format:
CFMZ 96.3 FM, Toronto/103.1 FM, Cobourg
CJPX 99.5 FM, Montreal
CKCL Classic 107 FM Winnipeg

The community CKUA radio network in Alberta and CFMU in Ontario also airs some classical music programming, as do some campus radio and community radio stations. All radio stations in Canada are required by the Canadian Radio-television and Telecommunications Commission (CRTC) to meet Canadian content targets. For classical music stations, the requirement is 20% Canadian content.

Music publications 
La Scena Musicale magazine (Montreal)
Musical Toronto magazine (Toronto)
The Wholenote magazine (Toronto)
Opera Canada magazine
Musicworks magazine

Schools, venues, and awards

Music schools 

Most major Canadian universities offer some type of instruction in Classical music in Bachelor of Music programs of BA (Music) programs, either in a practical sense via training in instrumental or vocal performance or conducting, or in a theoretical or academic sense through the study of Classical music harmonic theory or history. Some universities in Canada also offer graduate degrees in music, such as the Master of Music (in instrumental or vocal performance), the Master of Arts in theory or musicology, or more rarely, through the PhD in music theory or musicology.

The Royal Conservatory of Music (Canada) in Toronto offers a comprehensive teaching method encompassing strict guidelines for ten grade levels. The ARCT and LRCT diplomas for Teachers or Performers is the culmination of all the grades which is also recognized worldwide. Comprehensive theory and history co-requisites are required to obtain a certificate.  Many Canadian provinces recognize completion of higher levels of the curriculum, awarding students high school credits upon successful completion. The Royal Conservatory operates The Glenn Gould School, a centre for professional training in classical music performance, a Community School, an educational initiative for public school teachers, a Young Artists Performance Academy, and it offers RCM Examinations. Some of Canada's most famous musicians studied at the Conservatory. Glenn Gould studied theory, organ and piano, graduating at age 12 in 1946 with an ARCT diploma, with highest honours. Teresa Stratas, Lois Marshall and Jon Vickers were also Conservatory students.

The Schulich School of Music at McGill University in Montreal offers performance programs at McGill provide students with private lessons and performing opportunities in university ensembles, in addition to studies in the history and theory of music. The school also offers a three-year diploma of Licentiate in Music, an Artist Diploma program, and an Orchestral Training Program. McGill's Music Research Department offers B.Mus. programs in Composition, Theory, History, Music Education, Sound Recording, and Music Technology. The school has been ranked by The Princeton Review as among the top ten music schools in the world.

Music venues 

Concert halls with resident performing groups:
Place des Arts (Montreal)
Montreal Symphony House (Montreal)
Lambda School of Music and Fine Arts (Montreal)
Francis Winspear Centre for Music (Edmonton)
Jack Singer Concert Hall (Calgary Centre for Performing Arts)
Centennial Concert Hall (Winnipeg)
National Arts Centre (Ottawa)
Sony Centre for the Arts (Toronto)
Four Seasons Centre (Toronto)
Roy Thomson Hall (Toronto)
Massey Hall (Toronto)
Koerner Hall (Toronto)
Toronto Centre for the Arts (Toronto)
 Living Arts Centre (Mississauga)
Queen Elizabeth Theatre (Vancouver)
Rebecca Cohn Auditorium (Halifax)
Rose Theatre (Brampton)

Awards and competitions 
Glenn Gould Prize
Banff International String Quartet Competition
Montreal International Music Competition/Concours international de musique de Montréal
Eckhardt-Gramatté National Music Competition for the Performance of Canadian Music/Concours national de musique Eckhardt-Gramatté
Lynnwood Farnam Organ Competition (formerly, the John Robb Organ Competition)
Kiwanis Music Festival
Opera Canada Awards (The Rubbies)
The Montreal International Classical Guitar Festival and Competition
Juno Awards
Canadian Music Competition
Standard Life Competition, Orchestre Symphonique de Montréal

Financing 
Arts organizations in Canada are usually expected to raise 50% of their funding through ticket sales and/or fundraising campaigns that they organize and execute themselves.  Another 25% is traditionally covered by corporate sponsorship. The remaining 25% is typically provided by three separate levels of government: federal, provincial and municipal. Canadian arts organizations are constantly lobbying all three levels of government for a more prominent place in their budgets and must therefore compete with other public concerns such as health care and education.

See also 

André Gagnon
Jorane
Lambda School of Music and Fine Arts
Domaine Forget
Music of Canada

References

External links 
Canadian music periodicals. CMPI Library and Archives Canada
opera.ca An association of many Canadian opera companies.
chamberfest Ottawa Chamber Music Society.
 Brampton Symphony Orchestra
 Rose Theatre, Brampton